Jeffrey Sharp is an American feature film and TV producer and Executive Director of The Gotham Film & Media Institute (formerly Independent Filmmaker Project).

Sharp has produced a series of Academy Award and Golden Globe-winning and nominated films, including Boys Don't Cry, You Can Count on Me, Nicholas Nickleby, and Proof. Additional credits as Producer include: A Home at the End of the World, The Night Listener, Evening, and The Yellow Birds.  Sharp's recent US-China co-productions include: "My Other Home (film)", "Wonderful Life (TV)", and "Crazy Alien (film)".

Sharp co-founded the digital publisher Open Road Integrated Media with former HarperCollins CEO Jane Friedman, which has become a leading independent e-book publisher in the US. At Open Road, Sharp looked for new ways to option film and TV rights as part of the publishing process, which led to the formation of Story Mining & Supply in Los Angeles in 2012 where Sharp, as President and CEO, oversaw the development and production of several feature films and TV shows from Open Road and other publishing properties including Outlander (nominated for three Golden Globes®).  Sharp launched Sharp Independent Pictures in 2016 with GEM Pictures to produce films for the US and China co-production market.

Sharp has served on the Colgate University Board of Trustees since 2019. He is a member of AMPAS (The Academy of Motion Picture Arts and Sciences),a member of the Hamptons International Film Festival Advisory Board and has served as Special Advisor for the Book Meets Film Forum at the Taipei International Book Expo, as well as London Book Fair, Frankfurt Book Fair and BookExpo of America.  Sharp won an Independent Spirit Award for Best First Feature for You Can Count on Me, was nominated for a Best Picture Golden Globe for Nicholas Nickleby, and was honored with the Andrew Sarris Award in 2005 from the Columbia University School of the Arts for his contribution to independent film. Sharp graduated with an MFA in Film Studies from Columbia University and a BA from Colgate University.

Jeffrey Sharp is the son of William Sharp (Scientist).

Filmography

References

External links
 

Living people
Film producers from New York (state)
Columbia University School of the Arts alumni
Colgate University alumni
American chief executives
Year of birth missing (living people)